The 2020 Polish Super Cup was the 30th Polish Super Cup, an annual Polish football match played between the reigning winners of the Ekstraklasa and Polish Cup. This season Ekstraklasa champion Legia Warsaw met Polish Cup champion Cracovia.

The match originally scheduled on 9 August 2020 was finally held on 9 October 2020 at the Stadion Wojska Polskiego in Warsaw – the home of the Ekstraklasa champions Legia. On 8 August 2020, the Polish Football Association announced that the match was canceled due to suspicion of COVID-19 in one member of the medical staff of Legia Warsaw. On 18 September 2020 Polish Football Association announced a new SuperCup match date on 9 October 2020.

Cracovia played their first ever Super Cup match, while Legia tried to win their 5th SuperCup after not being in the Super Cup last year for the first time since 2010.

The game finished with a 0–0 draw after regular time. The extra-time has not been played. Cracovia won 5–4 on penalties.

Match

See also
2019–20 Ekstraklasa 
2019–20 Polish Cup

Notes

References

2020
2020–21 in Polish football
Sports competitions in Warsaw
August 2020 sports events in Poland
Polish SuperCup, 2020
Polish Super Cup 2020